Shoeburyness railway station is the eastern terminus of the London, Tilbury and Southend Line (Engineer's Line Reference FSS), serving the suburb of Shoeburyness, Essex. Its three-letter station code is SRY.

The line and station were opened in 1884 when the London, Tilbury and Southend Railway expanded east from Southend. The station and all trains serving it are currently operated by c2c.

Description
Shoeburyness is arranged in a through-station layout despite being a terminus. It was opened on 1 February 1884 by the London, Tilbury and Southend Railway. As a result of this layout, the station has step-free access from the town's high street to all of its platforms. Platforms 1 and 2 have an operational length for thirteen-coach trains and Platform 3 an operational length for nine-coach trains. A connection exists to the Ministry of Defence site nearby at Pig's Bay, to the east over a level crossing on the high street, and extensive carriage sidings exist to the west comprising 31 sidings.

The ticket office is equipped with the Tribute ticket issuing system. The station has sheltered bicycle storage, a taxicab rank, and a car park.

The station was renovated in January 2013 to improve customer safety, security and facilities for the c2c customers.

When London Underground's District line operated a seasonal non-stop excursion train service between 1910 and 1939 through to the Southend area, Shoeburyness was the terminus.

Services 

The typical off-peak service frequency is:

 2 tph (trains per hour) to London Fenchurch Street via Basildon.
On weekends there are some services that run to/from Liverpool Street station via Stratford and some that run via Tilbury Town railway station.

All services are operated by c2c who use the British Rail Class 357.

References

External links 

c2c Online - Shoeburyness station
Southend Timeline

Railway stations in Essex
DfT Category E stations
Railway stations in Southend-on-Sea
Former London, Tilbury and Southend Railway stations
Railway stations in Great Britain opened in 1884
Railway stations served by c2c
Buildings and structures in Southend-on-Sea